Henry Keyes (January 3, 1810 – September 24, 1870) was a prominent politician and railroad executive from Vermont. He was a member of the Vermont House of Representatives and Vermont Senate. He was also the Democratic nominee for governor three times (1856, 1857, 1858). In addition, Keyes served as president of the Atchison, Topeka and Santa Fe Railway.

Early life
Keyes was born in Vershire, Vermont on January 3, 1810, the son of Thomas and Margaretta (McArthur) Keyes. He was raised and educated in Vershire, and moved to Newbury at age 15 to work at the Reed & Gould store. In 1831, he left Reed & Gould to go into business with his brother Freeman. The brothers operated the F. and H. Keyes Store, which became the largest general store in the Connecticut River Valley.

Business and farming career
In addition to the store, Keyes was active in several other business ventures. In 1843, he was an original incorporator of the Connecticut and Passumpsic Rivers Railroad. Keyes served as a director and succeeded Erastus Fairbanks as president in 1854. Under Keyes's leadership, the railway completed a connection to the Grand Trunk Railway in 1870.

Keyes's other business interests included ownership stakes in Boston's United States Hotel as well as mines, steamboats and stagecoaches. Keyes was also a large shareholder in the Atchison, Topeka and Santa Fe Railway. He was appointed the company's president in February 1869.

He also owned and operated a farm that included land on both sides of the Connecticut River in Newbury and in Haverhill, New Hampshire, where he raised Durham cattle and Merino sheep. Keyes also served as president of the Vermont State Agricultural Society. From 1853 to 1855, Keyes served as a trustee of Norwich University.

Political career
A Democrat, Keys represented Orange County in the Vermont Senate from 1847 to 1849. From 1855 to 1856, Keyes was Newbury's member of the Vermont House of Representatives.

In 1856, Keyes was the Democratic nominee for governor and lost to Republican nominee Ryland Fletcher. He ran again in 1857 and lost again to Fletcher, and was the unsuccessful Democratic nominee in 1858, losing to Hiland Hall.

Keyes was the chairman of the Vermont delegation to the 1860 Democratic National Convention. The delegates met in Charleston, South Carolina in April and were unable to agree on a presidential nominee. The convention reconvened in Baltimore, Maryland in June and nominated Stephen A. Douglas.

Death
In mid-September 1870, Keyes became ill. He died in Newbury on September 24. Keyes was buried at Oxbow Cemetery in Newbury.

Family
In May 1838, Keyes married Sarah A. Pierce of Stanstead, Quebec. They had no children and she died in 1853. In May 1856, Keyes married Emma F. Pierce, a sister of his first wife. They were the parents of five children—Henry, Martha, Ezra, George, and Charles.

Keyes's son, Henry W. Keyes (1863–1938), became Governor of New Hampshire in 1917. In 1918, he was elected to the U.S. senator in 1919.

References

External links

1810 births
1870 deaths
People from Vershire, Vermont
People from Newbury, Vermont
Democratic Party members of the Vermont House of Representatives
Democratic Party Vermont state senators
Atchison, Topeka and Santa Fe Railway presidents
19th-century American politicians
Burials in Vermont
19th-century American businesspeople